The Macedonian Handball Super League, is the top-tier team handball competition in North Macedonia. It is currently sponsored by VIP. As of 2018, the Macedonian Handball Federation is ranked 8th in the world.

List of champions

 1992–93 :  Pelister
 1993–94 :  Pelister
 1994–95 :  Borec 
 1995–96 :  Pelister
 1996–97 :  Prespa
 1997–98 :  Pelister
 1998–99 :  Vardar 
 1999–00 :  Pelister
 2000–01 :  Vardar 
 2001–02 :  Vardar
 2002–03 :  Vardar 
 2003–04 :  Vardar 
 2004–05 :  Pelister 
 2005–06 :  Metalurg
 2006–07 :  Vardar 
 2007–08 :  Metalurg
 2008–09 :  Vardar 
 2009–10 :  Metalurg
 2010–11 :  Metalurg
 2011–12 :  Metalurg
 2012–13 :  Vardar (PRO)
 2013–14 :  Metalurg
 2014–15 :  Vardar
 2015–16 :  Vardar
 2016–17 :  Vardar
 2017–18 :  Vardar
 2018–19 :  Vardar
 2019–20 : /
 2020–21 :  Vardar
 2021–22 :  Vardar

Performances

Clubs

EHF coefficients

The following data indicates Macedonian coefficient rankings between European handball leagues.

Country ranking
EHF League Ranking for 2020/21 season:

1.  (1)  LNH Division 1 (139.33)
2.  (2)  Handball-Bundesliga (132.83)
3.  (7)  Macedonian Handball Super League (115.00)
4.  (4)  Nemzeti Bajnokság I (99.83)
5.  (3)  Liga ASOBAL (96.17)

Club ranking
EHF Club Ranking as of 3 March 2019:

 10.  Vardar (669)
 18.  Metalurg (389)
 114.  Eurofarm Rabotnik (61)
 148.  Zommimak (43)
 179.  Pelister (31)

See also

 Macedonian Handball Cup

References

External links
 Macedonian Handball Federation 
 Macedonian Handball Forum
 Balkan Handball Federation

Handball in North Macedonia
Macedonia